Hordeum bulbosum, bulbous barley, is a species of barley native to southern Europe, northern Africa, the Middle East and as far east as Afghanistan, with a few naturalized populations in North America, South America and Australia. Since 1970 it has been used in the Hordeum bulbosum Method (or Technique) to produce doubled haploid (DH) wheat and barley plants by crossing it with T.aestivum or H.vulgare, followed by the elimination of the H.bulbosum chromosomes from the offspring. These DH plants are important in breeding new varieties of wheat and barley, and in scientific studies. H. bulbosum is also being looked at as a source of genes for disease resistance and other traits for barley crop improvement.

References

bulbosum
Taxa named by Carl Linnaeus
Flora of Malta